"So Hard Done By" is a song by Canadian rock band The Tragically Hip. It was released in May 1995 as the fourth single from the band's 1994 album, Day for Night. A different version is also on the 2014 re-issue of Fully Completely.

Charts

References

1994 songs
1995 singles
The Tragically Hip songs